Devisthan is the name of several towns and villages in Nepal:

Devisthan, Achham
Devisthan, Baglung
Devisthan, Khotang
Devisthan, Myagdi
Devisthan, Parbat